Jack Brett (17 June 1917 – 29 December 1982) was a British professional Grand Prix motorcycle road racer.

Brett was born in Leeds in the county of West Yorkshire, Northern England. He competed in the Grand Prix world championships from 1949 to 1960. He won his only world championship race in the 500cc class at the 1952 Swiss Grand Prix, riding an AJS. He was a two-time winner at the North West 200 race in Northern Ireland and finished on the podium four times at the Isle of Man TT. Brett completed the first-ever 100 mph lap of the North West 200 circuit in 1957.

Motorcycle Grand Prix results 

(Races in italics indicate fastest lap)

References

1917 births
1982 deaths
Sportspeople from Leeds
English motorcycle racers
350cc World Championship riders
500cc World Championship riders
Isle of Man TT riders